Maxime Goisset (born 4 April 1985 in Chenôve) is a French rower.

References 
 
 

1985 births
Living people
French male rowers
Olympic rowers of France
Rowers at the 2008 Summer Olympics
World Rowing Championships medalists for France
21st-century French people